Charlotte Mary Gertrude Strutt, 1st Baroness Rayleigh (29 May 1758 – 13 September 1836), known as Lady Charlotte FitzGerald from 1758 to 1789 and as Lady Charlotte Strutt from 1789 to 1821, was a British peeress.

Charlotte was the daughter of James FitzGerald, 1st Duke of Leinster, and his wife, Lady Emily, daughter of Charles Lennox, 2nd Duke of Richmond, and the second of the famous Lennox sisters. Lord Edward FitzGerald and Charles FitzGerald, 1st Baron Lecale, were her brothers. Through her mother she was a descendant of King Charles II.

In Toulouse on 23 February 1789 Charlotte married Joseph Strutt, later Member of Parliament for Maldon and the member of an Essex family that had made their fortune from its milling business. The couple had three children: a son, John (later the second Baron Rayleigh), and two daughters.

Her husband was offered a peerage for his services in the Army and Parliament but refused, and instead proposed that the honour be given to his wife. Hence, on 18 July 1821 Charlotte was raised to the peerage as Baroness Rayleigh, of Terling Place in the County of Essex.

Lady Rayleigh died in Bath in September 1836, aged 78, and was succeeded in the barony by her son, John. Joseph Strutt died in 1845.

Notes

References
Kidd, Charles, Williamson, David (editors). Debrett's Peerage and Baronetage (1990 edition). New York: St Martin's Press, 1990, 

1758 births
1836 deaths
Barons in the Peerage of the United Kingdom
Daughters of British dukes
Charlotte
Charlotte
Hereditary peeresses created by George IV